In rhetoric, eunoia is the good will speakers cultivate between themselves and their audiences, a condition of receptivity. In Book VIII of the Nicomachean Ethics, Aristotle uses the term to refer to the kind and benevolent feelings of good will a spouse has which form the basis for the ethical foundation of human life. Cicero translates  with the Latin word .

It is also a rarely used medical term referring to a state of normal mental health. Eunoia is the shortest English word containing all five main vowel graphemes.

In popular culture
Eunoia is a work by poet Christian Bök consisting of five chapters, each one using only one vowel.
In the science-fiction television series Earth: Final Conflict, Eunoia is the name of the native language of the Taelon race. Christian Bök was a consultant on that series and helped develop the language.
The debut album of math rock band Invalids.
In December 2015, the Ministry of Education in Singapore unveiled the name of a new junior College set to open in 2017, Eunoia Junior College. The unfamiliar name generated significant buzz in the Singapore community when it was first announced, including memes referencing Singlish homophones.
 Eunoia Technologies is the name of the firm Christopher Wylie founded after leaving Cambridge Analytica
 In classical music, Eunoia is a piano composition by Juan María Solare in the key of C Major (2021)

See also
Iouea, a similarly short word with all the vowels.

References

External links

Rhetoric